Saint Joseph with the Christ Child refers to a series of three works by Guido Reni. The earliest dates to c. 1625-1630 and is in the Diocesan Museum of Milan, whilst a 1635 version is now in the Hermitage Museum and a c.1640 version in the Houston Museum of Fine Arts.

Gallery

References

1620s paintings
1635 paintings
1640 paintings
Paintings of Saint Joseph
Paintings depicting Jesus
Paintings in Milan
Paintings by Guido Reni
Paintings in the collection of the Hermitage Museum
Paintings in the collection of the Museum of Fine Arts, Houston